Gustavo Franchin Schiavolin (born 18 February 1982), simply known as Gustavo, is a Brazilian former professional footballer who played as a centre-back.

Club career
Born in Campinas, São Paulo state, Gustavo started his career at  Guarani. He made his debut in 2001 Campeonato Brasileiro Série A and played four times in 2002 Copa do Brasil.

In July 2002 Gustavo moved abroad for the first time in his career, joining Levski Sofia. In January of the following year he moved to Dynamo Moscow, but failed to make an appearance for the latter.

In July 2003, Gustavo returned to Brazil and signed for Goiás, but his only campaign ended with only one match. He subsequently agreed a deal with Ponte Preta in 2004, appearing regularly.

In June 2005, he signed an 18-month contract with Série B side CRB. He made his debut on 8 July, starting in a 3–0 loss against Portuguesa.

Gustavo appeared in only nine league matches in the season, however, and scored a brace in a 3–2 away loss against Ituano. In November, with his side already out of the competition, he was loaned to Série C club Coruripe until December, but did not play.

In 2006 Gustavo joined Série A side Paraná. On 18 December 2006, after appearing in 34 matches for the club, he signed a two-and-a-half-year contract with Schalke 04.

However, Gustavo refused to play for the German club despite signing the contract, alleging a desire to remain in his homeland due to personal reasons. In April 2007, his registration rights was owned by a company, Traffic, and he was assigned to Desportivo Brasil, being subsequently loaned to Palmeiras on 1 May 2007.

Gustavo won the 2008 Campeonato Paulista with Verdão, and signed a contract extension in August, with his deal running until 31 December 2011 and the loan until 31 December 2009. On 29 January 2009, his loan was cut short, and he moved to Cruzeiro hours later, in a season-loan, with a 20% percentage if the player was sold during his spell at Raposa.

On 1 January 2010, Gustavo further extended his link with Desportivo Brasil again, until 1 September 2012. On that date, he joined Vasco da Gama, also on loan, after only appearing rarely with his former club; however, he only appeared sparingly for his new side, being mostly a backup.

He also obtained Italian nationality though ancestry in order to by-pass the non-EU policy of FIGC.

Gustavo made his Serie A debut on 12 September 2010, starting in a 1–0 home win against Fiorentina. He finished the campaign with 24 appearances (19 starts), as his side narrowly avoided relegation.

On 2 July 2011, Gustavo returned to Brazil and signed an 18-month contract with Botafogo, and extended his contract with Desportivo Brasil until December 2012. He only started in nine matches in 2011, and was subsequently released in December.

In January 2012 Gustavo was loaned to Portuguesa. After appearing sparingly during the year's Campeonato Paulista, he appeared regularly in the national league, with Lusa finishing only one position above the relegation places.

Gustavo was released in January 2013, and joined Chinese Super League side Qingdao Jonoon in the following month. In April of the following year he moved to second-tier team Paraná, and after appearing regularly joined fierce rivals Atlético Paranaense.

Honours
Paraná
Campeonato Paranaense: 2006
Palmeiras
Campeonato Paulista: 2008

References

External links

1982 births
Living people
Sportspeople from Campinas
Brazilian people of Italian descent
Brazilian footballers
Association football central defenders
Campeonato Brasileiro Série A players
Campeonato Brasileiro Série B players
Guarani FC players
Goiás Esporte Clube players
Associação Atlética Ponte Preta players
Clube de Regatas Brasil players
Associação Atlética Coruripe players
Paraná Clube players
Desportivo Brasil players
Sociedade Esportiva Palmeiras players
Cruzeiro Esporte Clube players
CR Vasco da Gama players
Botafogo de Futebol e Regatas players
Associação Portuguesa de Desportos players
Club Athletico Paranaense players
Esporte Clube Bahia players
Avaí FC players
PFC Levski Sofia players
FC Dynamo Moscow reserves players
FC Schalke 04 players
Serie A players
U.S. Lecce players
Chinese Super League players
Qingdao Hainiu F.C. (1990) players
Brazilian expatriate footballers
Brazilian expatriate sportspeople in Bulgaria
Expatriate footballers in Bulgaria
Brazilian expatriate sportspeople in Russia
Expatriate footballers in Russia
Brazilian expatriate sportspeople in Germany
Expatriate footballers in Germany
Brazilian expatriate sportspeople in Italy
Expatriate footballers in Italy
Brazilian expatriate sportspeople in China
Expatriate footballers in China